Henry Kay(e) may refer to:

Sportspeople

Henry Kaye (cricketer) (1875-1922), Middlesex CCC cricketer
Henry Kay (1851–1922), Hampshire cricketer

Others
Henry Kaye (fl. 2000s–2020s) of The Static Jacks
Sir Henry Kaye, 2nd Baronet (1889-1956) of the Kaye Baronets

See also
Harry Kay (disambiguation)